'''Consuelo Mata Parreño (Universitat de Vamència) is a Spanish Teacher who specialises in Iberian material culture. She is currently the head teacher of the Department of Archaeology at the University of Valencia.

Notable work
Mata, along with Helena Bonet Rosado and Joan Bernabeu Auban, published early work on the organisation of Iberian polities in the Valencian Community, arguing for hierarchical relationships between oppida in region.

Mata and Bonet also published a typology of Iberian fine (class A) and coarse (class B) pottery, which is widely used by Iberian archaeologists.

Mata led excavations at the Iberian site of Kelin, on the outskirts of modern Caudete de las Fuentes, and field surveys of the surrounding Requena-Utiel region.
The site of Kelin continues to be presented through public education events, particular 'open door' days.

Mata and Bonet led the excavation of Puntal dels Llops, a small Iberian hilltop fort near modern Olocau.

In recent years, Mata and colleagues have published on the actual and symbolic uses of plant and animal products in Iberian life.
This project has created online databases of the many types of evidence for these uses.

See also
Iberian culture

References

Sources

External links 

Full list of works: Dialnet
Iberian flora and fauna: Flora y fauna ibérica

1954 births
Living people
20th-century Spanish archaeologists
Academic staff of the University of Valencia
Spanish women archaeologists
21st-century Spanish archaeologists